William Perry Barnett (born May 10, 1956 in St. Paul, Minnesota) is a former professional American football player who played defensive tackle for six seasons for the Miami Dolphins in the National Football League. He lives in Lincoln, NE as a copyright maintaining a residence in northern MN for fishing expeditions.

References

1956 births
Living people
Players of American football from Saint Paul, Minnesota
American football defensive tackles
Nebraska Cornhuskers football players
Miami Dolphins players
Sportspeople from Naples, Florida